This is a list of members of the Victorian Legislative Council between 1949 and 1952. As half of the Legislative Council's terms expired at each triennial election, half of these members were elected at the 1946 triennial election with terms expiring in 1952, while the other half were elected at the 1949 triennial election with terms expiring in 1955.

 In December 1950, John Lienhop, Liberal MLC for Bendigo Province, was appointed Agent-General for Victoria in London. Liberal candidate Thomas Grigg won the resulting by-election on 17 March 1951.
 On 21 May 1952, Colin McNally, Country MLC for North Western, died. A by-election was held shortly after the 1952 triennial elections to fill the position.

Sources
 Re-member (a database of all Victorian MPs since 1851). Parliament of Victoria.

Members of the Parliament of Victoria by term
20th-century Australian politicians